The Cathedral of St. John the Evangelist (commonly referred to locally as St. John's Cathedral) is a historic Roman Catholic church building located at 1007 Superior Avenue in Cleveland, Ohio, in the United States. Completed and consecrated in 1852, it is the cathedral of the Roman Catholic Diocese of Cleveland. Numerous renovations have enlarged and changed some aspects of the cathedral, but it remains essentially the same since its construction.

History

Large numbers of Catholics started to arrive in the Western Reserve region of Ohio in the 1830s and were served by visiting priests sent north by the Archdiocese of Cincinnati. A small group of Irish settlers established St. Mary's of the Flats in 1826. The congregation met in several locations before beginning construction on its own sanctuary in 1837. When Pope Pius IX established the Diocese of Cleveland in 1847, he named Louis Amadeus Rappe as its first bishop.

Bishop Rappe established St. John's Cathedral on Superior Street and Erie Street (today's East 9th Street) on land purchased in 1845 by St. Mary's pastor Rev. Peter McLaughlin. He selected architect Patrick Keely, who designed the building in an ornamental gothic style, and the bishop laid the cornerstone on October 22, 1848. Until the new building was completed in 1852, St. Mary's served as cathedral for the diocese. At the time of its completion, the new cathedral was the well beyond Cleveland's Public Square.

Alterations and additions began on the church almost as soon as the initial construction was complete. In 1857, a boys' school was added, and within ten years, it was joined by a parish hall and girls' school. In 1879, the parish raised sufficient funds to complete interior and exterior decoration and add a spire. To fund the initial construction, Bishop Rappe was forced to seek donations from sources as far away as New York City and France.

In 1884, the church interior was redecorated and stained glass windows were added along with walnut furnishings in the sanctuary and the windows were replaced again in 1902 with art glass windows from Munich.

On August 20, 1920, the cathedral was the site of the funeral for famed baseball player Ray Chapman. Thousands gathered inside and around the cathedral for one of the largest funerals in the history of Cleveland. Chapman was a popular player that only days before was killed when hit in the head by a pitched baseball. He remains the only player to have been fatally injured during a Major League baseball game.

In 1943, Archbishop Joseph Schrembs announced a plan to renovate the cathedral, but because of World War II, the plan did not move forward until 1945. After World War II, Schremb's successor, Edward Francis Hoban, continued Schrembs' plan. Construction began in 1946, when the old cathedral was enlarged and the brick exterior refaced in orange Tennessee Crab Ochard Sandstone. The architectural firm of Stickle, Kelly and Stickle oversaw construction, which also included a new bell tower and interior decoration. However, the tower held no bells until 1988. John W. Winterich and Associates supervised the creation of a new reredos and other interior decoration. The cathedral currently has seating for approximately 1,500 worshippers.

The new cathedral contained several new chapels including the Resurrection Chapel, which holds the tombs of former bishops, and the relics of St. Christine of Calixtus (whose relics were discovered in the Catacombs of St. Calixtus outside of Rome), presented to Archbishop Scrembs by Pope Pius XI in 1925. Evidence shows that Christine was a girl of 13 or 14 who died for her faith around the year 300. In keeping with tradition of that time, she had been buried with a small glass vial of her blood, in testament of having given her life for the Faith as a martyr.

The 4368 pipe/72 rank organ constructed by the Holtkamp Organ Company of Cleveland that was installed during the renovation still serves the church today. The organ may be operated from a console in the loft or another behind the cathedra. On September 4, 1948, Archbishop Hoban with Cardinal Francis Spellman of New York City celebrated a Mass to mark the renovation of St. John's Cathedral.

The renovation added a structure to house St. John's College. St. John's later merged with Ursuline College and the building was demolished to construct the Eaton Center in 1981. In 1964, St. John's added a dormitory tower which was later remodeled to house diocesan offices. In 2007, the diocese relocated its offices and this was demolished to create a parking lot for the burgeoning Avenue District around St. Clair Avenue and East 12th Street. A parking garage was built nearby to accommodate parishioners.

In 1977, Bishop James Hickey carried out additional renovations due to Vatican II reforms. The altar was moved west from the apse to its current location in the crossing. This is approximately where the altar of the original cathedral stood.

Parishioners raised funds in 1988 to install bells in the tower that was added during the 1946–48 renovation. The bells first rang to celebrate the Christmas Masses in 1988.

In 1996, Cleveland's Italian American community provided funds to renovate the sacristy in celebration of Bishop Anthony Pilla's election as President of the United States Conference of Catholic Bishops in 1995. In 1997, the diocese celebrated its 150th anniversary. That year ABC-TV produced a special on celebrating Christ's splendor at the cathedral. Bishop Pilla dedicated a Holy Door in 2000 as part of the Holy Year proclaimed by Pope John Paul II. In 2002, the cathedral renovated its flagpole and rededicated it on September 11, 2002, one year after the attacks of September 11, 2001.

In 2006, Bishop Pilla retired and Pope Benedict XVI named Bishop Richard Lennon of Boston as the 10th Bishop of Cleveland. In November 2016, Bishop Lennon sent a request to Pope Francis for early retirement owing to declining health. On December 28, 2016, Pope Francis accepted his resignation as bishop. That same day, Pope Francis named Daniel Edward Thomas, the Bishop of the Diocese of Toledo, as Apostolic Administrator of the diocese.

On July 11, 2017, Pope Francis named Nelson Jesus Perez, Auxiliary Bishop of the Diocese of Rockville Centre, as the 11th Bishop of the Diocese of Cleveland. He was officially installed as Bishop on September 5, 2017. Three years later—after Perez was named Archbishop of Philadelphia—Pope Francis named Edward C. Malesic as Bishop of Cleveland.

See also

List of churches in the Roman Catholic Diocese of Cleveland
List of Catholic cathedrals in the United States
List of cathedrals in the United States

References

External links

 Official Cathedral Site
 Roman Catholic Diocese of Cleveland Official Site

John's Cathedral, Cleveland
John's Cathedral, Cleveland
John's Cathedral, Cleveland
Roman Catholic churches completed in 1852
Italian-American culture in Cleveland
Gothic Revival church buildings in Ohio
Roman Catholic churches in Cleveland
1852 establishments in Ohio
Cathedrals in Cleveland
19th-century Roman Catholic church buildings in the United States